Mary C. Billings (Ward; after first marriage, Granniss; after second marriage, Webster; after third marriage, Billings; pen names, M.C.G., Mrs. M.C. Granniss; July 12, 1824 – March 2, 1904) was an American evangelist, missionary, and writer. She was Texas' first ordained woman Universalist minister.

Billings, an ordained minister in the Universalist Church, did missionary work in Texas, and associated with her husband, of the same congregation, who was superintendent of its missions in the State. Though Billings largely gave her life to clerical work, she displayed great activity in other fields. She wrote two books, one a work of fiction, entitled Emma Clermert, and the other a holiday publication, known as The Wonderful Christmas Tree. Both were well received and were flatteringly commended by the press. While abroad, she wrote "Thitherside Sketches," which were serially published in Ladies' Repository, a Boston monthly, running through two years of that publication. Billings was also a prolific writer for northern journals and periodicals, denominational and secular. These productions were both in prose and verse, and from each, certain works were compiled in book form for literary readers. Among these compilations may be mentioned "Poets and Poetry of Printerdom," "Women in Sacred Song," and "Our Women Workers". Billings was a member of The Texas Woman's Press Association, and of The Woman's State Council. Widowed three times, Billings had no children.

Early life and education
Mary Charlotte Ward was born in Litchfield, Connecticut, July 12, 1824. Her father was William Ward. William's grandfather, Rev. Solomon Palmer, a Presbyterian minister, was educated at Old Yale.

Billings was not systematically educated. For the older children of the family, her parents were anxious that they should receive the best education, and encouraged them to work hard, until the health of several failed, and they died. With Billings, they took the other extreme; and she was allowed plenty of books, but freedom from all schoolroom restraints, and time to exercise in the open air. Her first published poem was written at the age of 12.

Career

Mary Granniss

In 1845, Billings married Frederick Granniss, also of Litchfield, who was a wealthy silk merchant. They moved to Hartford, Connecticut, and joined the Hartford Universalist congregation. The years 1859–60, she traveled abroad with him, and put the result of her experiences and observations into a series of letters called "Thither-Side Sketches" for  Ladies' Repository. After returning from their foreign trip, they built a suburban home, known as "Lilfred's Rest." Here, for several years, she led a happy, quiet, intellectual life, reading what she enjoyed, and writing when the spirit moved her. Her first book, Emma Clermont was published in 1849. The poor health of Frederick precipitated a move to Turpentine Camp in the pine forests of Alabama with the hope for an improvement in Frederick's health. Her letters from the forest of Alabama were instructive and entertaining. "Bear Ye One Another's Burdens" was a touching poem, containing a whole sermon. They eventually returned to Hartford where Frederick died in 1866.

Mary Webster
In 1869, the widow married the Universalist minister and publisher, Rev. Charles Henry Webster. She assisted her husband in his pulpit ministry as a lay preacher while Charles was performing missionary work. Though never ordained, she often back-filled for absent ministers. During this time, she was interested in every project for the welfare of women, including serving as Vice President of the Woman's Centenary Association for seven years, as well as writing prose and verse for the denominational periodical press. In 1877, Charles died. At some point of time in the 1870's, Mary took in her niece, Charlotte Henrietta Ward, daughter of her older brother, Henry Ward, after his death.

Rev. Mary Billings
In 1885, in Waco, Texas, she married Rev. James Billings, another Universalist minister and publisher. They settled in Hico, Texas where she was licensed in 1886 and ordained as a Universalist minister on October 3, 1892. She was widowed again in 1898.

Mary Billings died March 2, 1904, in Hico, and is buried at Hico Cemetery.

Selected works

As Mrs. M. C. Granniss
 Emma Clermont; or, Life's changes. A tale., 1850
 Order of exercises at the dedication of the new Universalist Church, Hartford, Conn., November 1, 1860. , 1860

As Mary C. Webster
 The Wonderful Christmas Tree!: A Story in Rhyme

References

Attribution

Bibliography

External links
 
 "Thither-Side Sketches", by M. C. G. in the Ladies' Repository, vol. 30, 1862 (Public domain)

1824 births
1904 deaths
19th-century American writers
19th-century American women writers
19th-century American clergy
19th-century American women musicians
19th-century pseudonymous writers
Writers from Connecticut
People from Litchfield, Connecticut
American hymnwriters
Clergy of the Universalist Church of America
Religious leaders from Connecticut
Pseudonymous women writers
Activists from Connecticut
American women hymnwriters
People from Hico, Texas